"Never Knew Lonely" is a song written and recorded by American country music artist Vince Gill.  It was released in September 1990 as the fourth single from the album When I Call Your Name.  The song reached number 3 on the Billboard Hot Country Singles & Tracks chart.

Music video
The music video was directed by John Lloyd Miller and premiered in late 1990.

Chart performance

Year-end charts

References

1991 singles
Vince Gill songs
Songs written by Vince Gill
Song recordings produced by Tony Brown (record producer)
MCA Records singles
Music videos directed by John Lloyd Miller
1989 songs